Gyan Vigyan Academy  is a  private, coeducational, junior college located in Dibrugarh, Assam, India.
It was established in 2007 and offers higher secondary courses in arts, science and commerce streams under Assam Higher Secondary Education Council, concentrating on the higher secondary syllabus and preparation of students for various all India entrance examinations. The college also provides hostel facilities.

Location
 
It is located at Boiragimoth, Dibrugarh. The newly constructed  Dibrugarh railway station is less than 1km distance from it. It is situated in Kachari Gaon.

References

Schools in Assam
Dibrugarh
Educational institutions established in 2007
2007 establishments in Assam
Colleges in India